P.Sivakami (born 30 November 1957) is an Indian Dalit-Feminist writer, former IAS officer and activist predominantly writing in Tamil. Her notable works include Pazhayana Kazhidalum, Kurruku Vettu, Nalum Thodarum and Kadaisi Mandhar. Apart from being one of the most prominent Dalit novelists in India, she has also constantly voiced her opinions on contemporary social and political issues. An author of six novels and more than 60 short stories. P. Sivakami has regularly kept in touch with editing and has actively contributed to the monthly magazine Puthiya Kodangi since 1995. She is a significant presence on social media through her Twitter account.

Early life and education 
P. Sivakami was born in Perambalur,Tamil Nadu. Her father, M.Palanimuthu, is an independent MLA.  She has graduate and post-graduate degrees in history.

Career

Early career
In an interview with The Business Standard in February 2016, she said, "Bureaucracy has treated me like an untouchable".

Literary career
Since 1995, she has been centrally involved in the publication of the literary journal Puthiya Kodangi and has a lively investment in issues that touch Dalit and other backward castes and women in Tamil Nadu. She is the first Tamil Dalit Woman to write a novel Pazhiyana Kazhidalum in 1989. A literary and commercial success, the novel created a stir by taking on patriarchy in the Dalit movement. The novel is translated by the author herself and published in English as The Grip of Change (2006). Her second novel Anandhayi is about the violent treatment of women and was translated into English by Pritham K Chakravarthy as The Taming of Women in 2011. Her first poetry collection, Kadhavadaippu, was published in October 2011. Sivakami has written four critically acclaimed novels, all of them centred on Dalit and Feminist themes. She has written numerous short stories and poems focusing on similar issues. Sivakami's novels portray the rustic story of women who suffer at the hands of men who strongly believe in and stand for patriarchy. The conflicts and struggles are between tenacious women and tyrannical men in the contemporary society.

Sivakami made a short film Ooodaha (Through) based on a story written by one of her friends. Set in 1995, it was selected by the National Panorama and won the President Award the same year.

Political career 
She quit the Indian Administrative Service in 2008 after 29 years and joined politics a year later, contesting the Lok Sabha polls from Kanyakumari representing the Bahujan Samaj Party (BSP). However, she lost the elections.

In 2009, she founded her own political party, Samuga Samathuva Padai, which was based on the principles of the Dalit icon B. R. Ambedkar.

Bibliography 
 Pazhayani Kazhidalum ("In the Grip of Change", 1988)(cf. 2013)
 Pazhayani Kazhidalum Asiriyar Kurippu ("Author's Notes for The Grip of Change", 1995)
 Kurruku Vettu (1999)
 Ippadiku Ungal Yadharthamulla (1986)
 Nalum Thodarum (1989)
 Kadaisi Mandhar (1995)
 Kadaigal (2004)
 Anandhayi
 Kadhavadaippu (2011)
 Pal̲aiyan̲a kal̲italum, பழையன கழிதலும், 2013 (First version 1988)
 in German: Die Zeiten ändern sich. Transl. Thomas Vogel. Draupadi, Heidelberg 2020
 Udal Arasiyal ("Body Politics", essays)

References

Further reading 
 Satyanarayana, K & Tharu, Susie (2011) No Alphabet in Sight: New Dalit Writing from South Asia, Dossier 1: Tamil and Malayalam, New Delhi: Penguin Books.
 Satyanarayana, K & Tharu, Susie (2013) 'From those Stubs Steel Nibs are Sprouting: New Dalit Writing from South Asia, Dossier 2: Kannada and Telugu'', New Delhi: HarperCollins India.

1957 births
Living people
Dalit women writers
Dalit writers
Tamil writers
Indian feminist writers
20th-century Indian women writers
Indian women essayists
20th-century Indian essayists
Women writers from Tamil Nadu
Indian Administrative Service officers